Sarang Khan Gakhar (d. 1546) was the Chief of the Gakhars, who was made ruler of Pothohar Plateau by the Mughal emperor Babar for his submission to the Mughal authority in northern Punjab region of modern day Pakistan, before being captured and killed by Sher Shah Suri of the Sur Empire.

Early life

Father's assassination 

In 1519, Tatar Khan was assassinated by his nephew Hathi Khan, due to envy and hatred.

War with Hathi Khan 
Sarang Khan and Adam Khan, both being young, escaped to Dangali. They then desired their share of the land and thus anarchy and disorder took rise. The hate, enmity, anarchy and discord coming from both sides increased to such an extent that war between Hathi Khan and the two brothers became inevitable and so they began to attack each other.
 
It is famously known that the vanguards in the army of Hathi Khan declared that they would not strike any with the spear besides Sarang Khan. One of them, named Murad Khan, struck the head and face of Sarang Khan with a spear.

Assassination of Hathi Khan
Hathi Khan made peace with the Kaswals and married a daughter from the family of Basa Khan Kaswal, he also founded a township named after him, called Hathyah. The Kaswals, either due to old enmity or upon the encouragement of Sarang Khan, poisoned Hathi Khan through their daughter. He died due to this poisoning in 927 AH, 1520 CE after 12 years of rule.

Reign
After the death of Hathi Gakhar, Sarang Gakhar assumed leadership and the position of a Chief. 
Sarang paid heed to the advice of Hathi Khan and buried the body of the deceased Sultan in the township of Plakhar, Haveli, Pargana Dangali. After that he heated a Tandoor and placed the woman inside it, burning her and reducing her to ashes. That place thus became known as Tandoorwala. He granted Murad Khan Budhal a robe of honour and gave him the command that the Kaswals be banished. They were stationed in great numbers at Jogyalkot Fort, which is near to the east of Thoa. After much war and fighting, the fort was destroyed by a land mine and the Kaswals were banished from this region, they chose to settle in Pargana Anderhal.
 
 
In the mid 16th century, the Afghan king, Sher Shah Suri usurped the Mughal Empire under Humayun, the second Mughal emperor. Sarang resisted Sher Shah on the notion of loyalty to the ousted Mughals. Sarang was later captured by Islam Shah and flayed alive.
 
Sarang was thus martyred in 1546 and is buried in a tomb in Rawat Fort. His brother Adam Khan assumed leadership of the tribe and became the next Gakhar Chief.

See also
 Gakhars
 Gakhar Mandi

References

History of Punjab
Punjabi people